K. Gopal was an Indian politician and former Member of Parliament elected from Tamil Nadu. He was elected to the Lok Sabha from Karur constituency as an Indian National Congress candidate in 1971 and 1977 election.

References 

Indian National Congress politicians from Tamil Nadu
Living people
India MPs 1971–1977
India MPs 1977–1979
Lok Sabha members from Tamil Nadu
People from Karur district
Year of birth missing (living people)
Tamil Nadu MLAs 1991–1996